"Working on It" is a song by British singer-songwriter Chris Rea, released in 1989 as the fifth and final single from his compilation album New Light Through Old Windows (1988). It was written by Rea, and produced by Rea and Jon Kelly. "Working on It" reached No. 53 in the UK and No. 73 on the US Billboard Hot 100. It also topped the Billboard Mainstream Rock chart.

The song has appeared on the soundtracks of the American adventure comedy film Camp Nowhere and the TV film Beyond the Law.

Critical reception
Upon release, Billboard listed the song as a recommended pop single and commented: "Top-five hit at album rock shows Rea's new label affiliation to be a smart career move. Straight-ahead, four-on-the-floor power rock could find a home at pop outlets as well." The Philadelphia Inquirer commented that the song "deserve[s] hit status".

Track listing
7" single (US release)
 "Working on It" – 3:47
 "Loving You Again" (Live Version) – 5:20

7" single (UK/European release)
 "Working on It" – 4:24
 "One Golden Rule" – 4:29

7" single (Australian release)
 "Working on It" – 4:24
 "Driving Home for Christmas" – 3:58

7" single (US promo)
 "Working on It" – 3:47
 "Working on It" – 3:47

12" single (UK/European release)
 "Working on It" (Extended Mix) – 5:55
 "One Golden Rule" – 4:29

Cassette single
 "Working on It" (Edit) – 3:47
 "Loving You Again" (Live Version) – 5:20

CD single (German release)
 "Working on It" – 4:25
 "Working on It" (Extended Mix) – 5:55
 "One Golden Rule" – 4:30
 "Stainsby Girls" – 4:07

CD single (US release)
 "Working on It" (LP Version) - 4:24

Chart performance

Personnel
 Chris Rea - vocals, instruments, producer
 Jon Kelly - producer
 Justin Shirley-Smith - engineer
 Paul Lilly, Danny Hyde - mixing on "Loving You Again (Live Version)"
 Chris Rea, David Richards - producers of "One Golden Rule"

Other
 Kav Deluxe - design (US sleeve)
 Elizabeth Brady - illustration (US sleeve)
 Greg Jakobek - illustration (UK/European sleeve)

References

1988 songs
1989 singles
Geffen Records singles
Warner Records singles
Songs written by Chris Rea
Chris Rea songs